The women's 100 metres event at the 1999 European Athletics U23 Championships was held in Göteborg, Sweden, at Ullevi on 29 and 30 July 1999.

Medalists

Results

Final
30 July
Wind: -0.2 m/s

Heats
29 July
Qualified: first 2 in each heat and 2 best to the Final

Heat 1
Wind: -0.5 m/s

Heat 2
Wind: 0.9 m/s

Heat 3
Wind: 0.4 m/s

Participation
According to an unofficial count, 18 athletes from 12 countries participated in the event.

 (1)
 (1)
 (2)
 (2)
 (2)
 (2)
 (1)
 (2)
 (2)
 (1)
 (1)
 (1)

References

100 metres
100 metres at the European Athletics U23 Championships